Seeing a Large Cat is the ninth novel in the Amelia Peabody historical mystery series by Elizabeth Peters. The story takes place during the season of 1903-1904.

Plot summary

The book opens at Amelia's favorite hotel, Shepheard's in Cairo, where her family reunites after a summer in various locations. The Emersons' son Ramses (now aged sixteen) and their adopted son David have been living in Egypt for six months, and their ward Nefret has been studying anatomy with Louisa Aldrich-Blake at the London School of Medicine for Women.

The Emersons receive a dire warning about staying away from an undiscovered tomb, which of course inspires them to hunt all the harder for it. Meanwhile, a silly American debutante insists she needs protection from a stalker (selecting Ramses for the job), and a mummy swathed in modern clothing begins to lend verisimilitude to her otherwise unconvincing narrative.

The characters of Donald and Enid Fraser from Lion in the Valley reappear in this novel.  They are in Cairo, accompanied by a woman who claims to have communicated with an ancient Egyptian princess and unwittingly triggered Donald's obsession with finding the princess's tomb.  The American Cyrus Vandergelt is another character who reappears from an earlier novel.

This volume marks the death of the cat Bastet and the first whiskey Ramses is permitted to imbibe (although the two events are not directly related).

The device of "Manuscript H" is used for the first time in this book to give a voice to Ramses, through whom the romantic and adventurous elements of the series are able to continue as his parents begin to age.

In the course of the mystery, Amelia discovers that her old admirer and adversary, Sethos (the "master criminal") is not dead, as was thought to be the case earlier in the series.

Awards
The novel was nominated for an Agatha Award in the "Best Novel" category in 1997.

See also

List of characters in the Amelia Peabody series

References

1997 novels
Amelia Peabody
Fiction set in 1903
Fiction set in 1904
Novels set in Cairo
Novels set in hotels